Ayoquezco de Aldama , and , is a town and municipality in Oaxaca in south-western Mexico. The municipality covers an area of 58.69 km². 
It is part of the Zimatlán District in the west of the Valles Centrales Region.

As of 2005, the municipality had a total population of 4,385.

References

Municipalities of Oaxaca